George Geoffrey Hickson (born 26 September 1939) is an English former football goalkeeper who played in the Football League for Crewe Alexandra, Port Vale, Southport and Stoke City. He won promotion out of the Fourth Division with Crewe in 1962–63. He is one of six post-war players to have played for both the Potteries clubs as well as Crewe Alexandra.

Career
Hickson was born in Crewe and played as an amateur for Coventry City, Liverpool and Blackburn Rovers, before signing a professional contract at Stoke City in 1959. Long time regular Bill Robertson sustained an injury in the 1959–60 season, and Hickson was drafted in to provide cover. He played ten Second Division matches in December through to March but was dropped after conceding five away at Liverpool and Tommy Younger took his place for the remainder of the season. He played just once more for Stoke, on the final day of the 1960–61 season in a 3–1 win over Liverpool at the Victoria Ground. He joined his hometown club Crewe Alexandra in 1962, and played 43 of the club's 46 Fourth Division games as promotion was achieved in 1962–63. He then featured 30 times in the 1963–64 season, as Jimmy McGuigan's "Railwaymen" were relegated straight back out of the Third Division. He lost his place at Gresty Road under new boss Ernie Tagg, and featured just nine times in the 1966–67 campaign and was completely absent in the 1965–66 and 1967–68 campaigns. He was loaned to Fourth Division side Port Vale in August 1968, as manager Gordon Lee needed cover for the injured Stuart Sharratt. Described as a "part-time, pipe-smoking civil servant", he featured for the "Valiants" in the next twenty matches, but was recalled by Crewe in November that year. He later played for Southport, and played three Third Division games for the "Sandgrounders". He also had a loan spell with Shrewsbury Town, but did not take to the field at Gay Meadow. He later emigrated to South Africa to play for Cape Town City.

Career statistics
Source:

Honours
Crewe Alexandra
 Football League Fourth Division third-place promotion: 1962–63

References

1939 births
Living people
Sportspeople from Crewe
English footballers
Association football goalkeepers
Coventry City F.C. players
Liverpool F.C. players
Blackburn Rovers F.C. players
Stoke City F.C. players
Crewe Alexandra F.C. players
Port Vale F.C. players
Southport F.C. players
Shrewsbury Town F.C. players
English expatriate footballers
English emigrants to South Africa
Expatriate soccer players in South Africa
Cape Town City F.C. (NFL) players
English Football League players
National Football League (South Africa) players